160 Squadron of the Israeli Air Force (also known as The First Cobra or Northern Cobra Squadron) was formed in April 1980.

The squadron initially operated fifteen MD500s and three AH-1S Cobras. In the following year, nine AH-1F Cobras were delivered, followed by eight more in 1985, and four more in 1987. The squadron conducted operations during Operation Peace for Galilee, Israel's 1982 invasion of Lebanon, but did not initially engage in anti-tank combat, rather serving as close air support. In 2001, Israel acquired 15 AH-1E helicopters from the US Army. As of 2005, the squadron uses exclusively AH-1E/F helicopters.

The squadron was based at Palmachim Airbase.

On 2 August 2013, as part of the IDF's budget cut plans, along with the fact that the Cobra helicopters were considered relatively unsafe with many accidents credited to its operation history, it was closed (along with 140 Squadron,)

References
 160 Squadron - The First Cobra globalsecurity.org
 Palmachim Air Base globalsecurity.org

Israeli Air Force squadrons